The black-throated shrike-tanager (Lanio aurantius) is a species of bird in the family Thraupidae. It is found in Belize, Guatemala, Honduras, and Mexico. Its natural habitat is subtropical or tropical moist lowland forests.

References

black-throated shrike-tanager
Birds of Mexico
Birds of the Yucatán Peninsula
Birds of Belize
Birds of Guatemala
Birds of Honduras
black-throated shrike-tanager
Taxonomy articles created by Polbot